Ghost Stalkers is an American paranormal television series that premiered on October 19, 2014, in the United States on Destination America. It is executive produced by Nick Groff of Ghost Adventures. The series features a duo of paranormal investigators that came together over their near-death experiences. They want to prove there are portals in the world's most haunted locations. The show formerly aired on Sundays at 9:00 p.m. But by episode 4, was moved to Thursdays at 9:00pm EST.

Plot
The series follows two paranormal investigators who each went through an alleged near-death experience (NDE). During their investigations, they experiment with trying to find naturally occurring gateways or wormholes which may connect our reality with alternate realities or differing dimensions.

Opening Introduction by narrator:

Cast and crew
Chad Lindberg – Paranormal Investigator and actor
John E.L. Tenney – Researcher/Paranormal Investigator and author
David Rountree – Technology Consultant for the show.

Episodes

Season 1 (2014)

References

External links

2014 American television series debuts
2010s American documentary television series
2010s American reality television series
English-language television shows
Paranormal reality television series
Destination America original programming